boygenius is the debut extended play (EP) by American indie rock group boygenius, composed of Julien Baker, Phoebe Bridgers, and Lucy Dacus. It was released on October 26, 2018 by Matador Records.

Background and recording
Singer-songwriters Julien Baker, Phoebe Bridgers and Lucy Dacus self-produced and recorded the EP over four days in June 2018 at Sound City Studios in Los Angeles. The three made the decision to hire exclusively women for the process. Each member of the group brought one mostly-finished song to the studio that received further input from the other two; Baker contributed "Stay Down", Bridgers contributed "Me & My Dog", and Dacus contributed "Bite the Hand". Three additional songs emerged during the recording process from the trio's own demos.

Baker, Bridgers and Dacus formally announced the formation of boygenius in August 2018. On the same day, three singles, "Bite The Hand", "Stay Down" and "Me & My Dog" were released, and their eponymous EP was scheduled for release on November 9. On October 26, the EP was released digitally, two weeks ahead of schedule.

The album's cover is a reference to Crosby, Stills & Nash, the self-titled 1969 debut album by the American folk-rock supergroup consisting of David Crosby, Stephen Stills, and Graham Nash.

Critical reception

Boygenius has received acclaim from critics. At Metacritic, which assigns a normalized rating out of 100 to reviews from mainstream publications, the album received an average score of 84, based on 13 reviews. Rhian Daly of NME gave the EP a perfect score, stating "it serves as a reminder of each musician's particular powers – Bridgers' ability to spin haunting, poetic folk-pop out of beautiful simplicity; Dacus' sage and, often, wry indie-rock; and Baker's dramatic, emo-tinged exorcisms of emotion."

In a review for Pitchfork, Dayna Evans rated the album 8.3/10, writing that each member of Boygenius performs in "distinct musical styles": "For Bridgers, an intimate voice and shy guitar with a folkier bedroom softness; Baker, enormous emo minor tones and a voice that could blow down a building; Dacus, vocals that are clear and confrontational and a guitar shrouded in fuzz. When performed together, it yields an effective kind of magic."

Year-end lists

Track listing

Personnel
Credits adapted from liner notes.

Boygenius
 Julien Baker
 Phoebe Bridgers
 Lucy Dacus

Additional personnel
 Anna Butterss – bass
 Elizabeth Goodfellow – drums
 Joseph Lorge – engineering, mixing 
 Collin Pastore – mixing 
 Heba Kadry – mastering
 Lera Pentelute – photo

Charts

References

2018 debut EPs
Albums produced by Phoebe Bridgers
Boygenius albums
Matador Records EPs